The MAZEM – Mannheim Center for Empirical Multilingualism Research (in German: Mannheimer Zentrum für Empirische Mehrsprachigkeitsforschung) in Mannheim, Germany is a linguistic and educational research institute that originated at the University of Mannheim. MAZEM was established as a non-profit company in Mannheim in 2011 and is still headquartered there. It is registered under the legal form of a gGmbH. MAZEM conducts interdisciplinary research on early multilingualism, provides expertise on early language support and intervention to educators, institutions and policy-makers.

Research 
MAZEM originated from the 2002 founded "Research and Contact Area for Multilingualism (Forschungs- und Kontaktstelle Mehrsprachigkeit) and transfers knowledge from linguistic research to pedagogical and educational practice. The research focus is on multilingual language acquisition and teaching. MAZEM also provides advice and strategic expertise to policy-makers at regional, state as well as the federal level.

MAZEM conducts interdisciplinary research focussing on sociopolitical and educational challenges in the context of multilingual language acquisition and teaching as well as German as a Second/Foreign language (DaZ/DaF).

See also
 Mannheim School of Humanities
 Mannheim
 University of Mannheim

Notes and references

Research institutes in Germany
University of Mannheim